KittyWu Records is a Singapore-based record label, specializing in shoegaze, instrumental rock and electronic pop.  KittyWu Records also acts as an independent concert promoter. KittyWu Records was founded in 2007 by Errol Tan and Lesley Chew.

Bands on KittyWu Records 
 I Am David Sparkle, Singapore
 Deepset, Malaysia
 Amateur Takes Control, Singapore
 Monster Cat, Singapore

Releases on KittyWu Records 
 KWR001 I Am David Sparkle - "This Is The New" 
 KWR002 Deepset - "The Light We Shed Shall Burn Your Eyes" 
 KWR003 Amateur Takes Control - "You, Me and the Things Unsaid"

Concerts Produced by KittyWu Records 
 Labrador Asian Tour featuring Club 8 & Pelle Carlberg (Jan 2007, Singapore)
 Explosions in the Sky KL Tour co-produced with Soundscape Records (Feb 2007, Kuala Lumpur Malaysia)
 MONO Live in Singapore (July 2008, Singapore)
 toe Live in KL (September 2008, Kuala Lumpur Malaysia)

See also 
 I Am David Sparkle
 Labrador Records

External links 
 Official site

Singaporean independent record labels
Indie rock record labels